This was a tennis rivalry played between British player Laurence Doherty and the Irish player Harold Mahony, which in their respective careers met 18 times from 1896 until 1904.

Doherty and Mahony were both Grand Slam winners with Doherty winning six slam titles and two Olympic golds and Mahony winning one slam title, two Olympic silver medals and one bronze medal. Throughout their respective careers Doherty won 66 titles and Mahony 59 titles.

They first met in 1896 at the London (amateur) Grass Court Championships, Doherty was 22 years old when he first met 29 years old Mahony. At the Grand Slams they met three times, twice at Wimbledon and Doherty led (2-0) in matches and once at the US National Championships, Doherty led (1-0) they also met in the 1900 Paris Olympics final with Doherty again winning (1-0).

They played each other predominately on grass courts but also on clay courts and indoors on hard wood courts.

Challenge Rounds
Challenge Round: the final round of a tournament, in which the winner of a single-elimination phase (final) faces the previous year's champion, who plays only that one match. The challenge round was used in some tournaments in the early history of tennis (from 1877 through 1921).

Head-to-head

Official matches (Doherty 14–4 Mahony)

Breakdown of their rivalry
All matches: Doherty, 14–4
Outdoor courts: Doherty, 13-2
Clay courts: Doherty, 1–0
Grass courts: Doherty, 13–2
Indoor hard courts: Doherty, 2–1
Grand Slam matches: Doherty, 3–0
Grand Slam finals: Doherty, 1–0
Olympic finals: Doherty, 1-0
All finals: Doherty, 6–2

References

Sources
https://app.thetennisbase.com/Laurence Doherty v Harold Mahony, Head to Head, 1896 to 1904

External links
http://www.wimbledon.com/History 1890s.

Tennis rivalries